Ten Songs may refer to:

Music

Classical compositions
10 Songs, a composition by Mily Balakirev (1837–1910)
10 Songs, Op. 15 (1899), a composition by Josef Suk
10 Songs, BB 42 (1906), from Hungarian folksongs for voice and piano (Bartók)

Albums
10 Songs, a later version of Melvins! (album) by the Melvins
10 Songs (I Hate Myself album), 1997
10 Songs, a 2002 album by Friend/Enemy; see Tim Kinsella
Ten Songs by Adam Again, a 1988 album by Adam Again
Tensongs, a 1986 album by Hubert Kah
10 Songs (Travis album), 2020

See also

"Ten" (song) by Jewel
Diez canciones de Gardel, a 1931 Argentine film
Ten Blake Songs, a 1957 song cycle by Ralph Vaughan Williams
Biblical Songs, Op. 99 (1894), musical settings of ten texts by Antonín Dvořák
10 Songs for the New Depression, a 2010 album by Loudon Wainwright III 
Ten Songs in the Key of Betrayal, a 2004 album by Alien Crime Syndicate
Ten New Songs, a 2001 album by Leonard Cohen
Ten Songs for Another World, a 1990 album by The World of Skin
Ten Songs, Ten Years, Ten Days, a 2011 album by Tokyo Police Club 
Ten Songs from Live at Carnegie Hall, a 2015 album by Ryan Adams
Ten of Songs, a 1988 album by Robin Williamson (re-issued 1993) 
10 Song Demo, a 1996 album by Rosanne Cash
Dix chansons pour l'été, a 1958 album by Yves Montand